The God Who Is There is a Christian apologetic work written by American philosopher and Christian theologian Francis A. Schaeffer, published in 1968. It is Book One in Volume One of The Complete Works of Francis A. Schaeffer A Christian Worldview, and is the first book of Francis Schaeffer's "Trilogy."  It was written before Escape from Reason but released after that second book was written and published. The third book in the Trilogy He Is There and He Is Not Silent was published in 1972.

Table of Contents

Section I: The Intellectual & Cultural Climate of the Second Half of the Twentieth Century
Section II: The Relationship of the New Theology to the Intellectual Climate
Section III: How Historic Christianity Differs from the New Theology
Section IV: Speaking Historic Christianity into the Twentieth-Century Climate
Section V: Pre-Evangelism is No Soft Option
Section VI: Personal & Corporate Living into the Twentieth-Century Climate

References
 Richard H. Bube. (Review) Journal of the American Scientific Affiliation. Vol 21, June 1969, pp. 54–55
 Martin H. Cressey. (Review) The Churchman, Vol 83, Spring 1969, pp. 55–56.
 David L. Dye. (Review) Journal of the American Scientific Affiliation, Vol 21, June 1969, pp. 55–56
 Harold J. Franz. (Review) Westminster Theological Journal, Vol 32, November 1969, pp. 114–116.
 Arthur F. Holmes. (Review) His, Vol 29, February 1969, p. 26.
 Alan F. Johnson. (Review) Moody Monthly, Vol 69, June 1969, pp. 96–98.
 John F. Johnson. (Review) The Springfielder, Vol 33, Spring 1969, pp. 55–56.
 P. Lakey. (Review) Gordon Review, Vol 11, Summer 1969, p. 241-245
 Clark H. Pinnock. (Review) Christianity Today, Vol 13, January 3, 1969, p. 24.
 V. C. Pogue. (Review) The Expository Times, Vol 80, February 1969, pp. 143–44.
 John S. Reist, Jr. (Review) Foundations, Vol 12, April–June 1969, pp. 183–86
 John A. Witmer. (Review) Bibliotheca Sacra, Vol 126, July–September 1969, pp. 253–54.

Footnotes

External links
 Todd Kappelman, "The Need to Read Francis Schaeffer" An overview of Schaeffer's Trilogy from Probe Ministries. Retrieved 25 September 2006.

1968 non-fiction books
Books about Christianity